Peter Weckbecker (born August 30, 1864 – May 16, 1935), was a Major League Baseball catcher.

External links

1864 births
1935 deaths
Major League Baseball catchers
Indianapolis Hoosiers (NL) players
Louisville Colonels players
Baseball players from Pennsylvania
19th-century baseball players
Minor league baseball managers
Mobile (minor league baseball) players
New Haven Blues players
Hartford Dark Blues (minor league) players
Eau Claire (minor league baseball) players
Albany Governors players
Burlington Babies players
Buffalo Bisons (minor league) players
Rochester Flour Cities players
Albany Senators players
Shreveport Giants players
Galveston Sandcrabs players
Houston Buffaloes players
Fort Worth Panthers players
Denison-Sherman Twins players
Waco Tigers players
Paris Midlands players
San Antonio Bronchos players
Portsmouth Boers players